Urbieta is a Basque surname. Notable people with this surname include:

 Constantino Urbieta Sosa (1907–1983), Paraguayan football player
 
 Ibon Urbieta (born 1967), Spanish rower
 
 Juan de Urbieta (died 1553), Basque infantryman

See also
 , San Sebastian, Spain